Zwingenberg is a village in the Neckar-Odenwald district, in Baden-Württemberg, Germany.

History
Zwingenberg developed in the valley of the Neckar, below Zwingenberg Castle, as a possession of the Electoral Palatinate ruled via . In 1803, Zwingenberg became a possession of the Principality of Leiningen, which was mediatized to the Grand Duchy of Baden in 1806. Zwingenberg was assigned to the district of Eberbach in 1813.

Geography
Zwingenberg is physically located in the valley of the Neckar, which has cut itself deep into the local sandstone. Elevation above sea level in the municipal area varies wildly, from a high of  Normalnull (NN) to a low of  NN where the Neckar flows out of the municipality.

The Federally protected Zwerrenberg nature reserve lies within the municipal areas of Zwingenberg and Neuenkirchen.

Politics
Zwingenberg has one borough (Ortseil), Zwingenberg, and two villages, Burg Zwingenberg and Zwingenberger Hof.

Coat of arms
Zwingenberg's coat of arms displays three swan's heads, in white with yellow bills, upon a field of blue. This was the coat of arms of the House of Zwingenberg, which began to see local official use again in 19th century town seals. The  redesigned these seals into a coat of arms for Zwingenberg in 1913 and it was subsequently adopted by the municipal council.

References

External links

  (in German)

Neckar-Odenwald-Kreis
Populated places on the Neckar basin
Populated riverside places in Germany